Company B is the debut album by girl-group trio Company B. Released in 1987 on Atlantic Records, the album generated several dance club hits.  Group members at the time of the recording consisted of Lori L. (Ledesma), Lezlee Livrano and Susan Johnson, and all tracks were written and produced by Miami-based musician Ish "Angel" Ledesma.

Comprising eight Hi-NRG and Latin freestyle tracks, the album spawned four U.S. Hot Dance Club Play hits, including the single "Fascinated," which hit number one. The song also crossed over to pop radio and peaked at number 21 on the Billboard Hot 100.  Following the success of Company B, Livrano and Johnson left the group and were replaced by new members.

Track listing
 "Fascinated" — (5:24)
 "Spin Me Around" — (4:57)
 "Signed in Your Book of Love" — (5:31)
 "I'm Satisfied" — (5:12)
 "Perfect Lover" — (4:58)
 "Full Circle" — (5:43)
 "Jam on Me" — (5:06)
 "Infatuate Me" — (5:08)

Singles
 1987 "Fascinated" (#21 U.S., #1 U.S. dance)
 1987 "Full Circle" (#5 U.S. dance)
 1988 "Perfect Lover" (#12 U.S. dance)
 1988 "Signed in Your Book of Love" (#9 U.S. dance)

Chart performance

References

1987 debut albums
Company B (band) albums
Atlantic Records albums